Eutittha is a genus of spiders in the family Cheiracanthiidae. It was first described by Tamerlan Thorell in 1878.

Species
 it contains 9 species:
E. brevicalcarata (L. Koch, 1873) – Indonesia (Lombok), Australia (Western Australia)
E. excavata (Rainbow, 1920) – Australia (Norfolk Is.)
E. insulana Thorell, 1878 – Indonesia (Moluccas: Ambon)
E. lanceolata (Chrysanthus, 1967) – Indonesia (New Guinea)
E. lompobattangi (Merian, 1911) – Indonesia (Sulawesi)
E. marplesi (Chrysanthus, 1967) – Indonesia (New Guinea)
E. mordax (L. Koch, 1866) – Australia, New Hebrides, Samoa, Solomon Is., Tonga?, French Polynesia?
E. stratiotica (L. Koch, 1873) – Australia (Victoria, Tasmania), New Zealand
E. submordax (Zhang, Zhu & Hu, 1993) – China, Taiwan, Japan

See also
 List of Cheiracanthiidae species

References

Further reading

Cheiracanthiidae genera
Taxa named by Tamerlan Thorell
Spiders of Asia
Spiders of Oceania